Year 995 (CMXCV) was a common year starting on Tuesday (link will display the full calendar) of the Julian calendar.

Events

By place

Japan 
 17 May - Fujiwara no Michitaka (imperial regent) dies.
 3 June: Fujiwara no Michikane gains power and becomes Regent.
 10 June: Fujiwara no Michikane dies.
 30 August - Retainers of Takaie clash with retainers of Michinaga, on the main street of Kyoto.
 4 September - Michinaga’s escort, Hata no Hisatada, is killed by Takaie’s followers.
 15 October - Michinaga becomes Chief of the Fujiwara Clan.

Byzantine Empire 
 Arab–Byzantine War: Emperor Basil II launches a counter-campaign against the Fatimid Caliphate. He leads a Byzantine expeditionary army (13,000 men) to aid the Hamdanid emir Sa'id al-Dawla, and crosses Asia Minor in only sixteen days. Basil lifts the siege of Aleppo, and takes over the Orontes Valley. He incorporates Syria into the Byzantine Empire (including the larger city of Antioch) which is the seat of its eponymous Patriarch.

Europe 
 King Eric VI (the Victorious) dies at Uppsala, after a 25-year reign. He is succeeded by his son Olof Skötkonung, as the first baptized Christian ruler of Sweden.
 September 28 – Boleslaus II (the Pious), duke of Bohemia, storms Libice Castle and massacres the members of the Slavník Dynasty.
 Olaf Tryggvason is crowned king of Norway (until 1000) and builds the country's first Christian church.
 Malachy captures Dublin for the third time.

Scotland 
 King Kenneth II is murdered at a banquet by Lady Finella in Fettercairn. He is succeeded by his nephew Constantine III (a son of the late King Cuilén) as ruler of Alba (Scotland).

England 
 Uhtred (the Bold), a son of Ealdorman Waltheof I of Northumbria, establishes an episcopal see at Durham and moves the monastic community of Chester-le-Street there.

Asia 
 Goryeo-Khitan War: Negotiations led by the Korean diplomat Seo Hui prevents a fullscale invasion of the Khitan-led Liao Dynasty. King Seongjong accepts Liao's demands – and agrees to end the alliance with the Chinese Song Dynasty. Goryeo becomes a Liao tributary state, the Khitan army (60,000 men) withdraws while Seongjong orders the Korean border defenses strengthened.

Armenia 
995 Balu earthquake. It reportedly affected the Armenian areas of Balu, Cop'k (or Covk'), Palnatun (or Palin), and the districts of Hasteank and Xorjean. The areas affected were districts in what is currently the border area between Armenia and Turkey.

Births 
 Abu'l-Fadl Bayhaqi, Persian historian and writer (d. 1077)
 Cnut (the Great), king of Denmark, Norway and England (d. 1035)
 Dominic Loricatus, Italian priest and hermit (d. 1060)
 Frederick II, duke of Upper Lorraine (approximate date)
 Herman II, archbishop of Cologne (approximate date)
 Hemma of Gurk, German noblewoman (d. 1045)
 Olaf II Haraldsson (St. Olaf), king of Norway (d. 1030)
 Reginar V, French nobleman (approximate date)
 Shaykh Tusi, Persian Shia scholar (d. 1067)
 William I, Norman nobleman (approximate date)

Deaths 
 March 30 – Sahib ibn Abbad, Persian statesman 
 May 10 – Baldwin I (or Boudewijn), bishop of Utrecht
 May 16 – Fujiwara no Michitaka, Japanese nobleman (b. 953)
 June 13 – Fujiwara no Michikane, Japanese nobleman (b. 961)
 Abu 'Abdallah Muhammad, Afrighid ruler of Khwarezm
 Al-Mansur ibn Buluggin, Zirid ruler of Ifriqiyah
 Bernard I (the Suspicious), Frankish nobleman
 Egill Skallagrímsson, Viking poet (approximate date)
 Eric VI (the Victorious), Viking king of Sweden
 García Fernández, count of Castile and Álava
 Gebhard II, bishop of Constance (b. 949)
 Gerberga of Lorraine, Frankish noblewoman
 Haakon Sigurdsson, Viking ruler (jarl) of Norway
 Henry II (the Wrangler), duke of Bavaria (b. 951)
 Herbert III (the Younger), Frankish nobleman
 Kenneth II (the Fratricide), king of Alba (Scotland)
 Lady Finella, Scottish noblewoman and assassin
 Michitsuna no Haha, Japanese female poet
 Mstivoj, Obodrite prince (approximate date)
 Song, empress of the Song Dynasty (b. 952)

References

Sources